"On My Way to You" is a song written by Brett James and Tony Lane, and recorded by American country music singer Cody Johnson. It is the first single from his seventh studio album Ain't Nothin' to It.

Background

The song was written by Brett James and Tony Lane. It is Johnson's first song released under a major label.

Music video
A video for the song, directed by Sean Hagwell, was released in October 2018.

Commercial performance
The song has sold 107,000 copies in the United States as of April 2019.

Charts

Weekly charts

Year-end charts

Certifications

References

2018 songs
2018 singles
Cody Johnson songs
Warner Records Nashville singles
Songs written by Brett James
Songs written by Tony Lane (songwriter)